Lost Creek Township is one of eighteen townships in Platte County, Nebraska, United States. The population was 510 at the 2020 census. A 2021 estimate placed the township's population at 504.

Most of the Village of Platte Center lies within the Township.

History
Lost Creek Township was established in 1870.

See also
County government in Nebraska

References

External links
City-Data.com

Townships in Platte County, Nebraska
Townships in Nebraska